Game Show Models is a 1977 comedy-drama film directed by David N. Gottlieb. Set in Los Angeles, it is about a man who tries to make it in mainstream society by getting a job in a public relations firm.

Plot
Stuart Guber (John Vickery) is a writer who leaves his dancer girlfriend and cuts his hair to try to make it in the mainstream society of Hollywood. Stuart gets a job as a trainee in the office of a PR firm. He also enters into a relationship with one of the company's clients while working there. However, Stuart witnesses the negative side of mainstream society, which includes a sex-themed game show called Guessword created by a company executive. And eventually, he starts to realize that having a respectable job is not as fulfilling as he thought it would be.

Cast
John Vickery – Stuart Guber
Nick Pellegrino – Arnold Goldner
Gilbert DeRush – Roger Feinstein
Diane Sommerfield – Cici Sheridan
Diane Thomas – Josie
Sid Melton – Marvin Schmitt
Rae Sperling – Chick
Thelma Houston – Dana Sheridan
Cal Gibson – Bobby Jackson
Dick Miller – Game Show Host
Rainbeaux Smith - Model in Yellow Negligee (Uncredited)

References

External links
Game Show Models {DVD} -Vinegar Syndrome

1977 films
1977 comedy-drama films
1970s sex comedy films
American comedy-drama films
American exploitation films
American independent films
American sex comedy films
1970s English-language films
Films about Hollywood, Los Angeles
Films shot in Los Angeles
1977 independent films
1970s American films